The 1940 Bulgarian Cup Final was the 2nd final of the Bulgarian Cup (in this period the tournament was named Tsar's Cup), and was contested between Shipka Sofia and Levski Ruse on 3 October 1939 at Levski Playground in Sofia. Shipka won the final 2–0 (walkover).

Match

Details

See also
1938–39 Bulgarian National Football Division

References

Bulgarian Cup finals
Cup Final